The 2016 season of the Tamil Nadu Premier League was the inaugural edition of the TNPL, a professional Twenty20 cricket league in Tamil Nadu, India. The league was formed by the Tamil Nadu Cricket Association (TNCA) in 2016. Star India was the official broadcaster.

Teams

Source:

Tournament Results

Points Table
  advanced to the playoffs

Source:Cricbuzz

League progression

 C - Champion
 RU - Runner-up

Fixtures

 Team 1 - 1st innings.
 Winner in bold.

Playoffs

References

Twenty20 cricket leagues
Cricket in Tamil Nadu
Tamil Nadu Premier League
2016 in Indian cricket